The July 2007 Argentine winter storm resulted from the interaction of an area of low pressure systems across central Argentina  and the entry of a massive polar cold snap during the 6–8 July  2007;  it was the worst winter of Argentina in almost forty years. Severe snowfalls and blizzards affected the country. In Patagonia, several lakes were frozen.  The cold snap advanced from the south towards the central zone of the country during Friday, July 6, continuing its displacement towards the north during Saturday, July 7 and Sunday, July 8. On Monday July 9, the simultaneous presence of very cold air, above the average levels of the atmosphere as in the surface, gave place to the occurrence of snowfalls even in localities where snow is very rare. This phenomenon left at least 46 people dead in Argentina, six in Chile, and 3 in Bolivia.

It was the third time that a phenomenon like this happened in the country. The first time was in 1912 and the second one was in 1918, when the most significant volume of snow accumulation on the ground ever registered in Buenos Aires took place.
Since July 9 is a national holiday in Argentina, crowds gathered in the streets and parks all over the country to experience snow, many for the first time in their lives.

Cities affected by snowfalls 

During the July 9, 2007, weather radars, monitored this snowfalls and announced the cities that were affected by the blizzard. The coldest temperature plunged to −32 °C (−26 °F) and was registered in the province of Rio Negro.

Gallery

See also 
 August 2009 Argentine winter heat wave
 Climate of Argentina
 Climate of Buenos Aires

External links 

 Buenos Aires sees snowfall BBC News July 10, 2007
 Después de 30 años, nevó en varias ciudades del interior — La Nación 
 Videos enviados por los lectores — La Nación 
 Por primera vez en casi un siglo, nieva en la ciudad de Buenos Aires — La Nación 
 Y un día el país pareció la Patagonia — Clarín

References 

Weather events in Argentina
2007 in Argentina
2007 meteorology